Duran Duran are a Grammy Award-winning English rock band from Birmingham, United Kingdom. They were one of the most successful of the 1980s bands and a leading band in the MTV-driven "Second British Invasion" of the United States. Since the 1980s they have placed 14 in the Top 10 of the UK Singles Chart and 21 in the US Billboard Hot 100 and have sold more than 100 million records.

ASCAP Pop Music Awards
The ASCAP Pop Music Awards honors the songwriters and publishers of the most performed pop songs. 

!Ref.
|-
| rowspan=2|1994
| "Ordinary World"
| rowspan=2|Most Performed Songs
| 
| 
|-
| "Come Undone"
| 
|

American Music Awards
The American Music Awards is an annual awards ceremony created by Dick Clark in 1973. Duran Duran has been nominated once overall at the American Music Awards.

|-
| align="center" rowspan="2"|  ||Duran Duran|| Favorite Group Video Artist Pop, Rock, Band, or Duo || 
|-

BT Digital Music Awards
Launched in 2002, the BT Digital Music Awards were held annually in the United Kingdom.

|-
| 2004
| Duran Duran's official site
| Best Music Website
|

Billboard Music Awards
The Billboard Music Awards are held to honor artists for commercial performance in the U.S., based on record charts published by Billboard. 

|-
| rowspan=6|1983
| rowspan=6|Duran Duran
| Top Pop Artist 
| 
|-
| Top Duo/Group
| 
|-
| Top Pop Albums Artist
| 
|-
| Top Pop Albums Artist –  Duo/Group
| 
|-
| Top Pop Singles Artist
| 
|-
| Top Pop Singles Artist –  Duo/Group
|

Bravo Otto Awards
The Bravo Otto Awards are held by Bravo magazine, the largest teen magazine within the German-language sphere, to honor top performers in film, music, television and sport. 

|-
| 1985
| Duran Duran 
| Best Group (Silver)
|

Brit Awards
The Brit Awards are the British Phonographic Industry's annual pop music awards. Duran Duran has won two award from two nominations.

|-
|align="center" | 1985 ||"Wild Boys" || Best British Video || 
|-
|align="center" | 2004 || Duran Duran || Outstanding Contribution To Music  || 
|-

Classic Pop Readers' Awards
Classic Pop is a monthly British music magazine, which launched in October 2012. It was devised and founded by Ian Peel, who was also editor for the first 19 issues.  Rik Flynn stepped in as editor until Issue 23 followed by current editor Steve Harnell.  Ian Peel remains involved as Founder & Editor-at-Large.

|-
|align="center" |2020
| Themselves
| Group of the Year
|

GAFFA Awards (Denmark)

!Ref.
|-
| align="center" rowspan=2|2022
| Duran Duran
|International Band
| 
| rowspan=2|
|-
| Future Past
| International Album
|

Grammy Awards
The Grammy Awards are awarded annually by the National Academy of Recording Arts and Sciences. Duran Duran has received two awards from two nominations.

|-
| align="center"|  || "Girls on Film" / "Hungry Like the Wolf"  || Best Music Video, Short Form || 
|-
| align="center"|  ||Duran Duran || Best Music Video, Long Form || 
|-

Rock and Roll Hall of Fame

The Rock and Roll Hall of Fame is a museum located on the shores of Lake Erie in downtown Cleveland, Ohio, United States, dedicated to the recording history of some of the best-known and most influential artists, producers, and other people who have influenced the music industry.

|-
| 2022
| Performer
| Hall of Fame
| 
|-

Q Awards
Q Magazine was a monthly music magazine from the UK, where Duran Duran won a Lifetime Achievement Award.

|-
|align="center" | 2003 || Duran Duran || Q Lifetime Achievement Award || 
|-
|align="center" | 2015 || Duran Duran || Q Icon Award || 
|-

Golden Globe Awards
The Golden Globe Awards are awarded annually by the Hollywood Foreign Press Association. Duran Duran has received one nomination.

|-
|align="center"| 1986 || "A View to a Kill" from A View to a Kill || Best Original Song ||

MTV Video Music Awards
The MTV Video Music Awards is an annual awards ceremony established in 1984 by MTV.

|-
| align="center"|  || "The Reflex" || Best Editing in a Video || 
|-
| align="center"|  || "The Reflex" || Best Stage Performance in a Video || 
|-
| align="center"|  || "Wild Boys" || Best Direction in a Video || 
|-
| align="center"|  || "Ordinary World" || Best Cinematography in a Video || 
|-
| align="center"|  || Duran Duran || Lifetime Achievement Award || 
|-

MTV Europe Music Awards
The MTV Europe Music Awards is an annual awards ceremony established in 1994 by MTV Europe.

|-
| align="center"| 2015 || Duran Duran || Video Visionary Award || 
|-

Music Video Production Awards 
The MVPA Awards are annually presented by a Los Angeles-based music trade organization to honor the year's best music videos.

|-
| rowspan="2" | 2008
| rowspan="2" | "Falling Down"
| Best Adult Contemporary Video
| 
|-
| Best Colorist/Telecine
|

Hollywood Walk of Fame
Hollywood Walk of Fame

|-
| align="center"| 1993 ||Duran Duran ||Hollywood Walk of Fame|| 
|-

IM&MC Music Video Awards
The IM&MC Music Video Awards is Clip Competition Awards will be presented to winners during the telecast. The Marked the closing of the first International Music&Media Conference (IM&MC). The show was carried live by the BBC and The U.K.-based Music Box network, and was tapped for later presentation on MTV in the U.S. and MuchMusic in Canada. 

!Ref.
|-
| 1986
| Arena
| Best Story Line –  Long-form Video
| 
|

Ivor Novello Awards
The Ivor Novello Awards is an award ceremony for songwriting and composing, held annually in London, United Kingdom.

|-
| 1985 ||"The Reflex" || rowspan=2 | International Hit of the Year || 
|-
| rowspan =2 | 1986 || rowspan ="2" | "A View to a Kill" || 
|-
| The Best Film Theme or Song || 
|-
| rowspan =3 | 1994 || rowspan=3 | "Ordinary World" || International Hit of the Year || 
|-
| Best Song Musically and Lyrically || 
|-
| Most Performed Work || 
|-
| 2005 ||Duran Duran || Outstanding Contribution To Music  || 
|-

Lunas del Auditorio
Lunas del Auditorio are sponsored by The National Auditorium in Mexico to honor the best live shows in the country.

|-
| 2005
| rowspan=3|Duran Duran
| rowspan=3|Best Foreign Rock Artist 
| 
|-
| 2011
|
|-
| 2017
|

Pollstar Concert Industry Awards
The Pollstar Concert Industry Awards is an annual award ceremony to honor artists and professionals in the concert industry. 

|-
| 1988
| The Strange Behavior Tour
| Most Creative Stage Production
| 
|-
| 1989
| The Secret Caravan Club Tour 
| Club Tour of the Year 
|

Premios Ondas
The Premios Ondas have been given since 1954 by Radio Barcelona, a subsidiary of Cadena SER, in recognition of professionals in the fields of radio and television broadcasting, the cinema, and the music industry.

|-
| 2004
| Duran Duran
| Special Jury Award
|

Silver Clef Awards
The Silver Clef Awards are an annual UK music awards lunch which has been running since 1976. Duran Duran has received one award.

|-
| 2015
| Themselves 
| Silver Clef Award
|

Smash Hits Poll Winners Party
The Smash Hits Poll Winners Party (1988–2005) was an awards ceremony held annually by British magazine Smash Hits, and broadcast on BBC One. 

|-
| rowspan=3|1981
| Themselves 
| Best Group
| 
|-
| "Girls on Film"
| Best Single
| 
|-
| rowspan=3|Simon Le Bon
| rowspan=2|Most Fanciable Male 
| 
|-
| rowspan=5|1982
| 
|-
| Best Male Singer 
| 
|-
| Rio
| Best Album
| 
|-
| "Save a Prayer"
| rowspan=2|Best Single
| 
|-
| "Hungry Like the Wolf"
| 
|-
| rowspan=5|1983
| Themselves 
| Best Group
| 
|-
|"Union of the Snake"
| Best Video
| 
|-
| Simon Le Bon
| Best Male Singer
| 
|-
| John Taylor
| Most Fanciable Male
| 
|-
| Villa Park show 1983
| Event of The Year
| 
|-
| rowspan=8|1984
| Themselves
| Worst Group
| 
|-
| Themselves
| Best Group
| 
|-
| Seven and the Ragged Tiger
| Best Album
| 
|-
| "The Wild Boys"
| Best Single
| 
|-
| "The Wild Boys"
| Best Video
| 
|-
| Simon Le Bon
| Best Male Singer
| 
|-
| John Taylor
| Most Fanciable Male
| 
|-
| Roger Taylor Wedding
| Event of The Year
| 
|-
| rowspan=5|1985
| Themselves
| Best Group
| 
|-
| "A View to a Kill"
| Best Single
| 
|-
| Simon Le Bon
| Best Male Singer
| 
|-
| John Taylor
| Most Fanciable Male
| 
|-
| John Taylor
| Best Dressed Person
| 
|-
| rowspan=3| 1986
| Themselves
| Worst Group
| 
|-
| "Notorious"
| Best Single
| 
|-
| John Taylor
| Most Fanciable Male
| 
|-
| 1987
| Themselves
| Worst Group
|

UK Music Video Awards
The UK Music Video Awards is an annual award ceremony founded in 2008 to recognise creativity, technical excellence and innovation in music videos and moving images for music.

|-
| 2011 ||"Before the Rain" || Best Pop Video –  Budget  || 
|-
| 2012 || "Girl Panic" || Best Styling in a Video ||

References

Awards
Lists of awards received by British musician
Lists of awards received by musical group